The Flying Lizards is the 1979 debut album by The Flying Lizards and was released on the Virgin Records label.

Preceded by two surprise hit singles, the album reached No. 60 in the UK Albums Chart.

Background
Following the unexpected success of the group's 1979 singles—covers of "Summertime Blues" and "Money"—David Cunningham and Deborah Evans were offered a deal with Virgin Records. New material for the album featured improvisational musicians Steve Beresford and David Toop.

The album encompasses "dub-style audio experiments" and "bent interpretations of pop music constructs." Critic Simon Reynolds called it "an exercise in pop absurdism" which included "a Brecht-Weill cover, Sanskrit chants, found sounds, and unlikely instrumental textures" alongside "Cunningham's penchant for excessive studio processing and daft effects."

Charts

The album charted in the UK for 3 weeks from 16 February 1980 peaking at No. 60, and in New Zealand for 5 weeks peaking at No. 28.

Track list

1979 release
All tracks by David Cunningham except as noted
 "Der Song von Mandelay" (titled "Mandelay Song" on UK release) (Bertolt Brecht, Kurt Weill) - 2:27
 "Her Story" (Dave Solomon, David Cunningham, General-Strike, Vivien Goldman) - 4:37
 "TV" (David Cunningham, Deborah Evans-Stickland, General-Strike) - 3:51
 "Russia" - 6:11
 "Summertime Blues" (Eddie Cochran, Jerry Capehart) - 3:09
 "Money (That's What I Want)" (Berry Gordy, Janie Bradford) - 5:52
 "The Flood" - 4:57
 "Trouble" - 2:46
 "Events During Flood" - 3:25
 "The Window" (Vivien Goldman) - 4:52

Bonus tracks on 1995 CD
11.  "All Guitars" ("Summertime Blues" single B-side) - 2:41
12.  "Tube" (instrumental remix of "TV" - B side of "TV" single) - 5:09
13.  "Money (That's What I Want)" (single edit) - 2:32

General Strike are David Toop and Steve Beresford, who also made the album Danger In Paradise with David Cunningham in the years 1979-1982

Personnel
 David Cunningham
 David Toop
 Steve Beresford
 Michael Upton
 Deborah Evans-Stickland
 Vivien Goldman
 Julian Marshall

References
 "The Flying Lizards" album cover

1979 debut albums
The Flying Lizards albums
Virgin Records albums